The Basilica of St. Lawrence may refer to:

Basilica of St. Lawrence, Asheville, located in Asheville, North Carolina, United States of America
Basilica of St. Lawrence, Florence, located in Florence, Italy
Papal Basilica of Saint Lawrence outside the Walls, located in Rome, Italy

See also
 Basilica di San Lorenzo (disambiguation)
 Saint Lawrence (disambiguation)
 St. Laurence's Church (disambiguation)
 Cathedral of Saint Lawrence (disambiguation)